Monteiro is an occupational Portuguese surname meaning 'hunter'. Notable people with the surname include:

People with the surname

A – D 
Adolfo Casais Monteiro (1908–1972), Portuguese essayist, poet and writer
Alberto Monteiro (known as Fialho; 1928–2015), Portuguese footballer 
Aldo Geraldo Manuel Monteiro (known as Kadú; born 1994), Angolan footballer
Alex Monteiro de Lima (known simply as Alex; born 1988), Brazilian footballer
Allan Monteiro (born 1922), Pakistani boxer
Allan Monteiro Dias (born 1988), Brazilian professional footballer
Amarilson Monteiro (known as Xolote; born 1989), Cape Verdean professional footballer
Ana Monteiro (born 1993), Portuguese swimmer
Ananias Eloi Castro Monteiro (known simply as Ananias, 1989–2016), Brazilian footballer
André Monteiro (known as Ukra; born 1988), Portuguese footballer who plays for S.C. Olhanense
Antonio Monteiro (mathematician) (1907–1980), Portuguese mathematician
António Augusto Carvalho Monteiro (1848–1920), Brazilian-Portuguese businessman, bibliophile, entomologist and Freemason
Antônio Augusto Monteiro de Barros (1790–1841), Brazilian politician
António da Silva Monteiro, 1st Count of Silva Monteiro (1822–1885), Portuguese nobleman
António Isaac Monteiro, the foreign minister of Guinea-Bissau 2005–2007
António Mascarenhas Monteiro (1944–2016), the President of Cape Verde (1991–2001)
António Monteiro (politician) (born 1944), Portuguese politician
António Monteiro (canoeist) (born 1972), Portuguese sprint canoeist
Antônio Monteiro (actor) (born 1956), Brazilian actor, director and writer
Antonio Monteiro (mathematician) (1907–1980), mathematician born in Portuguese Angola
Antônio Monteiro Dutra (born 1973), Brazilian left back
Antonio Pedro Monteiro Lima (born 1948), the Permanent Representative to the United Nations for Cape Verde since 2007
Antônio Roberto Monteiro Simões, Brazilian-born linguist interested in the phonetics and phonology of the Romance languages
António Wesllem de Sousa Monteiro (known as Wesllem; born 1985), Portuguese footballer
Anjali Monteiro, documentary filmmaker, media educator and researcher who lives in Mumbai
Armando Monteiro (politician) (born 1952), Brazilian politician and lawyer
Armando Monteiro Filho (1925–2018), Brazilian businessman, engineer and politician
Armindo Monteiro (1896–1955), Portuguese university professor, businessman, diplomat and politician
Beatriz Monteiro (born 1999), Portuguese actress
Bernardino de Sousa Monteiro (1865–1930), Brazilian politician
Beto Monteiro (born 1975), Brazilian racing driver
Bruno António Monteiro Magalhães (born 1982), Portuguese professional footballer
Bruno Monteiro (born 1984), Portuguese footballer who currently plays for Vitória FC
Caio Monteiro (known as Caio Monteiro; born 1997), Brazilian footballer
Caralisa Monteiro, Indian singer 
Casimiro Monteiro (1920–1993), Portoguese PIDE agent
Carlos Monteiro (runner) (born 1965), Portuguese long-distance runner
Charles Monteiro (born 1994), São Toméan footballer
Chico Monteiro (1918–1990), Indian Roman Catholic Bishop of Goa
Cláudia Monteiro, Brazilian professional tennis player
Cléber Monteiro (born 1980), Brazilian footballer currently playing for C.D. Nacional
Cristina Lopes da Silva Monteiro Duarte (born 1962), Capeverdean politician
Daniel Feitosa de Araújo Monteiro (born 1992), Brazilian futsal player
Danilo Monteiro Martins (born 1998), Brazilian professional basketball
Darci Miguel Monteiro (known simply as Darci; 1968–2018), Brazilian professional footballer
Dário Monteiro (born 1977), Mozambican footballer who plays for Supersport United FC
Danielson Gomes Monteiro (born 1986), Romanian football player
Darci Miguel Monteiro (born 1968), retired Brazilian professional footballer
Diogo Filipe Monteiro Pinto Leite (born 1999), Portuguese professional footballer
Dóris Monteiro (born 1934), Brazilian singer and actress

E – H 
Éder Monteiro Fernandes (known simply as Éder; born 1983), Brazilian professional footballer
Edivaldo Monteiro (born 1976), Portuguese hurdler
Eduardo Monteiro (born 1966), Brazilian concert pianist, university professor and piano teacher
Elton Monteiro (born 1994), Portuguese footballer of Cape Verdean descent
Elvis Manuel Monteiro Macedo (known simply as Babanco; born 1985), Cape Verdean professional footballer
Ernest Steven Monteiro (1904–1989), physician in preventive medicine and Singapore's ambassador to Cambodia
Fábio Monteiro (born 1990), Portuguese footballer 
Felipe Augusto de Almeida Monteiro (known simply as Felipe; born 1989), Brazilian professional footballer
Felipe Monteiro Diogo (known as Sodinha; born 1988), Brazilian professional footballer
Fernando Monteiro de Castro Soromenho (1910–1968), Portuguese journalist and writer
Fernando Monteiro do Amaral (1925–2009), Portuguese politician and parliamentary
Firmino Monteiro (1855–1888), Afro-Brazilian painter
Flavia Monteiro Colgan (born 1977), Brazilian-American Democratic strategist 
Francisco Caetano Monteiro de Assis (also known as Kikas; born 1981), Angolan football player
Francisco Monteiro (1926–2002), Hong Kong swimmer
Francisca Maria Monteiro e Silva Vaz (known as Zinha Vaz; born 1952), Bissau-Guinean women's rights activist and politician
Gabriel Monteiro Vasconcelos (born 1996), Brazilian footballer
Gabryel Monteiro de Andrade (known as Gabryel the Destroyer; born 1999), Brazilian footballer
Gerson Monteiro (born 1973), Angolan professional basketball player
Gilson Monteiro Varela da Silva (known simply as Gilson; born 1990), Cape Verdean football player 
Hélder Prista Monteiro (1922–1994), Portuguese playwright and writer
Hugo Monteiro (born 1985), Portuguese professional footballer
Ivan Monteiro (born 1960), Brazilian electronic engineer
Júnior Monteiro (born 1991), Cape Verdean professional footballer
Giselli Monteiro (born 1988), Brazilian model and Bollywood actress
Henrique Monteiro Correia da Silva (known as Henrique Paço d'Arcos; 1878–1935), Portuguese statesman, navy officer and colonial administrator
Hugo Monteiro (born 1985), Portuguese footballer, who currently plays for Gil Vicente F.C.

I – L 
Inês Monteiro (born 1980), Portuguese athlete who competes in middle and long-distance track running
Isabel Monteiro, the London-based, singer-songwriter and bassist with three-piece alternative band Drugstore
Ivi Monteiro (born 1984), Brazilian butterfly and freestyle swimmer 
Jamiro Monteiro (commonly known as Jamiro; born 1993), Cape Verdean professional footballer
Jayden Marlon Monteiro (commonly known as Monté; born 2000), South African-based musician, audio engineer and public icon.
Jerônimo de Sousa Monteiro (1870–1933), Brazilian politician
Jeremy Monteiro (born 1960), Singaporean jazz musician
Jerson Monteiro (born 1985), professional soccer player
João César Monteiro, Portuguese film director, actor, writer and film critic
João Monteiro, Portuguese table tennis player
Joceline Monteiro (born 1990), Portuguese runner 
Joel de Oliveira Monteiro (1904–1990), Brazilian football player
Johnson Monteiro Pinto Macaba (born 1978), Angolan football striker, who plays for Chengdu Blades in the China League One
Johnny Monteiro (born 1938), Hong Kong field hockey player
Jorge Fernandes Monteiro (known as Jotamont; 1912–1998), Cape Verdean musician and composer
Jorge Monteiro (born 1988), known as Monteiro, Portuguese footballer
José Luís Monteiro (1848–1942), Portuguese architect
José Hipólito Monteiro (born 1939), Portuguese geologist and oceanographer
José Monteiro (footballer) (born 1982), Guinea-Bissauan footballer
José Monteiro (athlete), Portoguese Paralympian athlete 
José Monteiro (volleyball) (born 1991), Portuguese male volleyball player
José Pedro Monteiro (born 1959), Portuguese windsurfer
José Sabino Chagas Monteiro (born 1996), known as Sabino, Brazilian footballer 
Juliao Monteiro (born 1993), Timorese football player
Leonardo Sierra Monteiro (born 1987), Brazilian actor, engineer and entrepreneur
Kelvin Monteiro Medina (born 1994), Cape Verdean professional footballer
Lucas Monteiro (born 2001), Swiss footballer 
Luís de Matos Monteiro da Fonseca (born 1944), Cape Verdean diplomat and civil servant
Luís de Sttau Monteiro (1926–1993), Portuguese writer, novelist and playwright
Luís Monteiro (swimmer) (born 1983), Portuguese former swimmer
Luis Pedro Barros Barny Monteiro (born 1966), known as Barny, Portuguese footballer
Luiza Monteiro, Brazilian jiu-jitsu (BJJ) competitor
Lumen Monteiro (born 1952), Indian Roman Catholic bishop
Lurdes Monteiro (born 1984), Angolan handball player

M – Q 
Manuel Monteiro (born 1962), Portuguese lawyer and politician
Manuel Monteiro (born 1962), Portuguese jurist, professor and former politician
Manuel Monteiro de Castro (born 1938), secretary of the Congregation for Bishops appointed by Pope Benedict XVI in 2009
Manuel Rui Alves Monteiro (born 1941), Angolan writer of poetry, novels, theater plays, and short stories
Marco Monteiro (born 1966), Brazilian gymnast
Marcos Felipe de Freitas Monteiro (known simply as Marcos Felipe; born 1996), Brazilian professional footballer 
Maria do Céu Monteiro, President of the Supreme Court of Guinea-Bissau and also of the ECOWAS Court since 2012
Maria Monteiro Jardin, former Angolan minister for fisheries 
Marilyn J. Monteiro, psychologist specialized in the spectrum of autism disorder
Miguel Monteiro, (born 1980), Portuguese footballer currently playing with Valencia CF
Monteiro Lobato (1882–1948), one of Brazil's most influential writers, mostly for his children's books
Monteiro da Costa (born 1928), Portuguese footballer
Nélson Monteiro de Souza (known simply as Nélson Monteiro; 1904–?), Brazilian basketball player
Nuno Miguel Monteiro Rocha (born 1992), Cape Verdean professional footballer
Otávio Edmilson da Silva Monteiro (also known as Otávio or Otavinho; born 1995), Brazilian professional footballer
Osvaldo Monteiro (born 1963), Brazilian football manager and former player
Paulo Monteiro (artist) (born 1961), Brazilian artist 
Paulo Monteiro (footballer, born 1985), Portuguese footballer
Paulo Monteiro (footballer, born 1991), Portuguese footballer 
Pedro Miguel Cardoso Monteiro (known as Pelé,; born 1978), Cape Verdean footballer 
Pedro Monteiro (footballer) (born 1994), Portuguese footballer
Pedro Monteiro (swimmer) (born 1975), butterfly swimmer from Brazil

R – U 
Rafael Monteiro Alves da Silva( known as Rafael Silva; born 1984), Brazilian footballer
Rafael Pires Monteiro (known simply as Rafael; born 1989), Brazilian footballer 
Raimundo Monteiro (born 1957), Brazilian politician
Regilson Saboya Monteiro Júnior (known as Juninho Cearense; born 1980), Brazilian footballer
Ricardo José Vaz Alves Monteiro (born 1983), Portuguese footballer who plays for Rio Ave FC
Roberto Monteiro (also known as Roberto Batata; 1949–1976), Brazilian association football forward 
Roberto Leal Monteiro, Home Affairs Minister of Angola
Ronaldo Monteiro (born 1998), Bolivian football player
Rose Monteiro (née Bassett) (1840–1898), English plant collector and naturalist 
Rubenilson Monteiro Ferreira (born 1972), Brazilian football player
Rudy Monteiro (born 1996), Cape Verdean footballer 
Rui Monteiro (footballer, born 1977), retired Dutch football striker
Rui Manuel Monteiro Silva (born 1977), Portuguese track and field athlete and coach
Rui Monteiro (footballer, born 1977), Cape Verdean retired professional football player
Rui Monteiro (footballer, born 1991), Portuguese footballer
Ruth Monteiro, Bissau-Guinean lawyer
Sanny Monteiro (born 1989), Dutch professional footballer
Santinho Lopes Monteiro (born 1979), Cape Verdean-Dutch football player
Sergio Monteiro (born 1974), Brazilian pianist
Sergio Manuel Monteiro Semedo (born 1988), Cape Verdean professional footballer
Sonal Monteiro, Indian film actress
Telma Monteiro (born 1985), Portuguese judoka from the city of Almada
Thales Monteiro (1925–1993), Brazilian basketball player
Tiago Monteiro (born 1976), racing driver who drove for Jordan, Midland and Spyker MF1 Racing Formula One teams
Tiago Miguel Monteiro de Almeida (born 1990), Cape Verdean professional footballer
Thiago Monteiro (tennis) (born 1994), Brazilian tennis player
Tomás Antônio Maciel Monteiro, 1st Baron of Itamaracá (1780–1847), Brazilian politician and magistrate
Valéria Monteiro (born 1965), Brazilian journalist, model, actress, and television presenter

V – Z 
Vandré Sagrilo Monteiro (born 1979), Brazilian footballer
Vicente do Rego Monteiro (1899–1970), Brazilian painter
Wallyson Ricardo Maciel Monteiro (born 1988), Brazilian footballer
Wanderley Santos Monteiro Júnior (also known as Wanderley; born 1988), Brazilian footballer
Wania Monteiro (born 1986), Cape Verdean rhythmic gymnast
Wellington Monteiro (born 1978), defensive midfielder player from Brazil

See also
 Montero (name)

References 

Portuguese-language surnames